Mitar Markez (born 25 October 1990) is a Serbian handball player for Hungarian club Gyöngyösi KK and the Serbia national team.

Club career
After starting out at Crvenka, Markez moved abroad to France and signed with Montpellier in 2010. He helped the team win the LNH Division 1 in the 2010–11 season. Between 2011 and 2014, Markez played for German team Frisch Auf Göppingen, winning the 2011–12 EHF Cup.

International career
Markez was capped for Serbia at international level.

Honours
Montpellier
 LNH Division 1: 2010–11
Frisch Auf Göppingen
 EHF Cup: 2011–12

References

External links

 LNH record
 MKSZ record
 

1990 births
Living people
Sportspeople from Sombor
Serbian male handball players
RK Crvenka players
Montpellier Handball players
Frisch Auf Göppingen players
Handball-Bundesliga players
Expatriate handball players
Serbian expatriate sportspeople in France
Serbian expatriate sportspeople in Germany
Serbian expatriate sportspeople in Austria
Serbian expatriate sportspeople in Romania
Serbian expatriate sportspeople in Hungary